Bariji, or Bareji, is the name of several languages and dialects spoken near the Bariji River in the "tail" of Papua New Guinea: 

Bariji language
Baruga language
the Bareji dialect of the Gaina language